Saccharopolyspora antimicrobia is a Gram-positive, aerobic and non-motile bacterium from the genus of Saccharopolyspora which has been isolated from soil in Beijing and Sichuan in China.

References

 

Pseudonocardineae
Bacteria described in 2008